An ink eraser is an instrument used to scrape away or chemically bleach ink from a writing surface. This is a more involved process than removing pencil markings. Pencil marks can be gradually adhered to natural rubber fragments by rubbing the mark with a pencil eraser (this action is what prompted Joseph Priestly to give solidified latex its common name.) Ink, however readily penetrates the fibers of most papers and is therefore more difficult to extract by mechanical action. 

Older ink erasers are therefore small knives designed to scrape off the top few microns of a sheet of paper, removing the ink that had penetrated. In concert with bladed ink erasers an eraser similar to those at the end of pencils was also used, with additional abrasives, such as sand, mixed into the rubber. Fibreglass ink erasers also work by abrasion. These erasers physically remove the ink and the paper it has marked from the larger sheet. 

The chemical ink eradicator contains a substance that reacts with some inks removing their pigmentation and hiding the writing.

Metal ink erasers 

Metal ink erasers were generally used before chemical ink erasers were introduced, and when permanent writing was done in ink. The erasers were essentially small knives. This was the downfall of Metropolitan Life office boy George Millet, who fell on an ink eraser kept in his breast pocket while trying to evade the kisses of six steno girls on his 15th birthday. Millet was stabbed in the heart and died instantly.

Chemical ink erasers 

The chemical ink eraser was invented by the German manufacturer Pelikan in the 1930s and was introduced as a novelty in Germany in 1972 under the name Tintentiger (ink tiger).

Chemical ink erasers break down royal blue ink by disrupting the geometry of the dye molecules in ink so that light is no longer filtered. The molecules are disrupted by sulfite or hydroxide ions binding to the central carbon atoms of the dye. The ink is not destroyed by the erasing process, but is made invisible.  It can be transformed back into a visible work with aldehydes.

The eradicator only works with certain inks. Erasable inks of various colors exist, but royal blue is the most common.
After applying the eradicator, erasable ink cannot be applied in the erased area of the paper, where the chemicals remain.
For this reason, eradicators usually include a permanent blue felt tip that allows the user to write in the erased area.

See also
 Deinking
 Eraser

References

Writing implements
Visual arts materials
German inventions